The Vīramitrodaya is a commentary on Yajnavalkya Smriti and a Hindu law digest written by Mitramiśra which covers nearly every aspect of Dharmaśāstra.  The text also includes Vyavahāra as well, as the name would suggest.  The work was done at the behest of Vīrasimha, the king of Orchha, from 1605-1627.  The privy Council in the Benares School of Hindu Law considered the text to be a work of high authority.  Mitamiśra's text includes hundreds of citations in which he analyzes and critiques numerous arguments, particularly those made by members of the Bengal school.

Text
The text is divided into sections, called prakāśas which include:

Vyavahāra
 The Vyavahāra-Prakāśa is considered to be the largest nibandha, or digest written on the Vyavahāra
 The text is divided into four parts:

1.) Composition of the Court
 Constitution of the sabhā
 The Appointment of judges
 Conflict with the Dharmaśāstra
 Various grades of the courts
 Burden and means of proof

2.) Modes of Proof
 Witnesses
 Documents

3.) 18 Titles of Law
 the first is the non-payment of debts 
 deposits 
 sale without ownership 
 partnerships
 delivery and non-delivery of gifts
 non-payment of wages
 breach of contract
 cancellation of a sale or purchase
 disputes between owners and herdsman
 the Law on boundary disputes
 verbal assault
 physical assault
 theft
 violence
 sexual crimes against women
 Law concerning husband and wife
 partition of inheritance
 gambling and betting

4.) Matters for the king

Paribhāśā

Samskāra
Astrological matters relating to marriage

Rājanti
The qualifications of ministers
Preparing for battle
Routine for kings
Time and procedure for coronation

Āhnika
 The daily duties to be done when rising and before going to bed.

Pūjā
Those entitled to perform worship of the gods
 Proper flowers and clothing for worship

Tirtha
 Discuss those able to undertake a pilgrimage
 Times for a pilgrimage
 Ceremonial acts to be done for men, such as bathing, fasting and shaving.

Laksana
 The human body
 Qualities needed for the queen, ministers, astrologers, and physicians.

Notes

References

Hindu law
Sanskrit texts